Bilderberg may refer to:

 Bilderberg Hotel, a hotel in Oosterbeek in the Netherlands, namesake of the Bilderberg Group
 Bilderberg conference, an annual private conference